To be distinguished from Challenge Records (1920s) and Challenge Records (1950s)

Challenge Records is a record company and label in the Netherlands founded by Hein van de Geyn, Anne de Jong, and Joost Leijen in 1994. Its catalogue includes music by Nat Adderley, Paul Bollenback, Bob Brookmeyer, Keith Ingham, Rick Margitza, Enrico Pieranunzi, Yitzhak Yedid, Clark Terry, Jasper van 't Hof, Eric Ineke and Eric Vloeimans.

Imprints
Challenge's labels include Buzz, Between The Lines, Challenge Classics, Challenge Jazz Records, V-Flow, Double Moon (producer Volker Dueck), Challenge Jazz (producer Hein van de Geyn), Challenge Legacy, Retrieval (restorations by John R. T. Davies), Daybreak (producer Fred Dubiez), Timeless Jazz Legacy, A Records, JJ-Tracks, PineHill, Van Dyck Records, Supertracks Records, Drukplaten, Fineline, SunnyMoon Records, and Antoine Marchand.

Challenge also distributes many independent Dutch and German jazz labels.

See also
 List of record labels

References

External links
 Challenge Records International
 New Arts International

Dutch record labels
Record labels established in 1994
Classical music record labels
Jazz record labels
IFPI members